Kaiwhekea is an extinct genus of  plesiosaur from the Late Cretaceous (Maastrichtian age) of what is now New Zealand.

History of discovery

The type species, Kaiwhekea katiki, was first described by Arthur Cruickshank and Ewan Fordyce in 2002. It lived around the middle Maastrichtian. The single known specimen, found in the Katiki Formation near Shag Point on the coast of Otago, is nearly complete, and is on display at the Otago Museum in Dunedin, New Zealand.

Classification
Kaiwhekea has been placed as an aristonectine plesiosaur close to Aristonectes (O'Keefe and Street, 2009). In 2010, Kaiwhekea was transferred to Leptocleididae, but more recent analyses do not find the same result.

The following cladogram shows the placement of Kaiwhekea within Elasmosauridae following an analysis by Rodrigo A. Otero, 2016:

See also

 List of plesiosaur genera
 Timeline of plesiosaur research

References

External links
 Kaiwhekea, University of Otago, New Zealand

Late Cretaceous plesiosaurs
Extinct reptiles of New Zealand
Plesiosaurs of Oceania
Fossil taxa described in 2002
Sauropterygian genera